Cecelia Hall (Cece Hall) is an Oscar winning sound designer and sound editor. She was the first woman to be nominated for an Academy Award for Best Sound Effects Editing for Top Gun and went on to win the Oscar for The Hunt for Red October, a film for which she also received a British BAFTA nomination for Best Sound. 

In 1984, Hall was elected the first woman President of the Motion Picture Sound Editors and served on the Executive Committee of the Sound Branch of the Academy of Motion Picture Arts and Sciences from 1988 to 1995.

In 1995, Hall was invited to teach at the UCLA Graduate School of Theatre, Film and Television/Media and is still the only professor teaching sound design. In addition to teaching at UCLA, Hall has taken residencies at Savannah College of Art and Design (SCAD) and California State University, Monterey, Master Classes in sound in London as well as numerous panels and seminars on sound design. 

Hall has been the subject of numerous interviews and articles on Sound Design and women working in Hollywood. She is profiled in: Sound Design for Film, Working in Hollywood, The Women Who Run Hollywood and, The Editors Guild Magazine. Most recently, Hall is featured in the documentary, Making Waves: The Art of Cinematic Sound.

Awards and nominations
Both of these films are in Best Sound Editing.
1980 MPSE Awards-Nominated for Star Trek: The Motion Picture.
1983 MPSE Awards-Nominated for Star Trek II: The Wrath of Khan.
1985 MPSE Awards-Nominated for Star Trek III: The Search For Spock
1985 MPSE Awards-Nominated for Beverly Hills Cop.
1986 MPSE Awards-Nominated for Witness.
1987 Academy Awards-Nominated for Top Gun. Nomination shared with George Watters II. Lost to Aliens.
 1987 MPSE Awards-Nominated for Top Gun. Nomination shared with George Watters II.
 1990 MPSE Awards-Nominated for Harlem Nights.
 1991 MPSE Awards-The Hunt for Red October. Shared with George Watters II.
 1991 MPSE Awards-Nominated for Days of Thunder.
 1991 Academy Awards-The Hunt for Red October. Shared with George Watters II. Won.

 1991 BAFTAs-The Hunt for Red October. Nomination shared with George Watters II.

Selected filmography
Addams Family Values (1993)
Patriot Games (1992)
The Addams Family (1991)
Days of Thunder (1990)
The Hunt for Red October (1990)
Big Top Pee-wee (1988)
Beverly Hills Cop II (1987)
The Golden Child (1986)
Top Gun (1986)
Pee-wee's Big Adventure (1985)
Witness (1985)
Beverly Hills Cop (1984)
Star Trek III: The Search for Spock (1984)
Flashdance (1983)
Terms of Endearment (1983)
Airplane II: The Sequel (1982)
Star Trek II: The Wrath of Khan (1982)
Star Trek: The Motion Picture (1979)

References

External links

Sound editors
Best Sound Editing Academy Award winners
Living people
Date of birth missing (living people)
Women sound editors
Year of birth missing (living people)